The Counterfeiters is a 2010 television film based on the 1925 novel The Counterfeiters by André Gide. The two-hour film was directed by Benoît Jacquot and stars Melvil Poupaud as Edouard X., Maxime Berger as Olivier, and Dolores Chaplin as Lady Lilian Griffith.

Originally Jacquot, who is also the screenwriter, had planned this project as a 180-minute two-parter, but this was later reduced to a 120-minute telefilm.

The film premiered on France 2 on January 5, 2011. In March 2012, it was released on region 2 DVD by Optimale.

Cast 
 Melvil Poupaud as Edouard
 Patrick Mille as Robert de Passavant
 Jules-Angelo Bigarnet as Bernard
 Maxime Berger as Olivier
 Laurence Cordier as Laura Azaïs
 Vladimir Consigny as Vincent
 Dolores Chaplin as Lilian Griffith
 Jean-Marc Stehlé as Mr. Lapérouse
 Anne Bennent as Sphroniska
 Thomas Momplot as Georges
 Sandrine Dumas as Pauline
 Daniel Martin as Oscar
 Anne Duverneuil as Sarah
 Hervé Pierre as Mr. Profitendieu
 Catherine Davenier as Mrs. Profitendieu
 Pavel Stepantchuk as Boris
 Jean-Damien Barbin as Alfred Jarry

References

External links

2010 films
2010 LGBT-related films
Films directed by Benoît Jacquot
French LGBT-related television shows
LGBT-related drama films
2010 drama films
French drama films
Films based on French novels
Television films based on books
Films scored by Bruno Coulais
2010s French films